Robert Williamson III (born November 7, 1970) is an American poker player from Dallas, Texas.

Williamson grew up with three sisters in Granbury, Texas and received B.B.A. degrees in finance and real estate from Angelo State University in San Angelo.

He began playing aged 10 or 11, after being introduced to the game by his father. He quotes Russ Hamilton as the player he has learned from the most.

Williamson is known as an Omaha specialist, with numerous notable finishes in World Series of Poker (WSOP) Omaha tournaments.

Williamson had gastric bypass surgery between 2002 and 2005, reducing his weight from 400 lb to 200 lb. He now claims to be "half the man [he] used to be."

As of 2009, his total live tournament winnings exceed $1,900,000. His 20 cashes at the WSOP account for $1,101,976 of those winnings.

In 2015, Williamson has consistently finished high in the $100 daily no limit hold'em tournaments at the Aria.

Williamson and his wife, Cate Wakem-Williamson, own a high-end custom gaming jewelry line, "Robert Williamson III Designs."

World Series of Poker Bracelets

References

External links
 Official site
 Poker Pages interview
 Hendon Mob tournament results

1970 births
Living people
American poker players
World Series of Poker bracelet winners
Poker commentators
Angelo State University alumni
People from Granbury, Texas